Sawankhalok Station is a railway station located in Sawankhalok District, Sukhothai. This station uses signs as signals instead of lighted poles or semaphores and is operated manually. This is one of the two stations on the Northern Line that uses this signalling system, the other being Khlong Maphlap railway station, the preceding station. This station is the terminus of the Sawankhalok Branch from Ban Dara Junction.

Train services
 Special Express No. 3 Bangkok–Sawankhalok/Sila At

Notes
 Special Express No. 3 terminates at Sila At, not at Sawankhalok. Upon arrival at Sawankhalok, the train stops for about 15 minutes before reversing back the branch to Ban Dara and continuing up north to Sila At.
 Special Express No. 4 does not stop at this station upon returning to Bangkok and proceeds straight to Phitsanulok from Ban Dara Junction.

References
 
 
 

Railway stations in Thailand